The 1951–52 Washington Huskies men's basketball team represented the University of Washington for the  NCAA college basketball season. Led by second-year head coach Tippy Dye, the Huskies were members of the Pacific Coast Conference and played their home games on campus at Hec Edmundson Pavilion in Seattle, Washington.

The Final Four was played on the Huskies' home floor, won by Kansas.

Washington returned to the NCAA Tournament the next year, and advanced to the Final Four.

Postseason results

|-
!colspan=6 style=| Pacific Coast Conference Playoff Series

Rankings

References

External links
Sports Reference – Washington Huskies: 1951–52 basketball season

Washington Huskies men's basketball seasons
Washington Huskies
Washington
Washington